Rib Mountain may ref to the following places in Marathon County, Wisconsin:
Rib Mountain (town), Wisconsin, a town
Rib Mountain (CDP), Wisconsin, a census-designated place
Rib Mountain, a monadnock